Pekel is a small settlement in the Municipality of Trebnje in eastern Slovenia. It lies just north of Trebnje itself on the road to Račje Selo. The municipality is included in the Southeast Slovenia Statistical Region. The entire area is part of the historical region of Lower Carniola.

Name
Pekel was attested in written sources in 1436 as Hellentorf. Across Slovenia there are many oronyms, regional names, and microtoponyms named Pekel 'hell'. In folk geography, the name was used to metaphorically designate chasms, caves, shafts, and other narrow, dark places; for example, in Kropa there is an oeconym Pekel originally referring to a blacksmith's shop. Semantically related names in Slovenia include Devil's Hole in the settlement of Okrog and Devil's Ravine in the settlement of Parož. See also Pekel, Maribor, Hell Cave, and Hell Gorge.

References

External links
Pekel at Geopedia

Populated places in the Municipality of Trebnje